Abdullah Al-Naqbi (Arabic:عبد الله النقبي; born 28 April 1993) is an Emirati international footballer who plays as a midfielder for Emirati club Shabab Al-Ahli.

References

External links
 

1993 births
Living people
Emirati footballers
Association football midfielders
Khor Fakkan Sports Club players
Al Dhafra FC players
Al-Wasl F.C. players
Shabab Al-Ahli Club players
UAE First Division League players
UAE Pro League players
Olympic footballers of the United Arab Emirates
United Arab Emirates international footballers
Footballers at the 2014 Asian Games
Asian Games competitors for the United Arab Emirates